A repo or repurchase agreement is a financial instrument.

Repo may also refer to:

Arts and entertainment
Repo! The Genetic Opera, 2008 film by Darren Lynn Bousman
 Repo (album), 2009 album by Black Dice
 Repo Men, 2010 science fiction action film by Miguel Sapochnik

Computers
 Software repository, a stockpile of software assets such as binaries and source code available on the Internet
 Repository (version control), a metadata store used in a version control system
 Repo, a multiple Git repository tool

People
 Repo (name), list of people with the name

Other uses
 Repossession of collateral, for a defaulted loan

See also 
 Repo 105, an accounting maneuver
 Operation Repo, a TV show
 Repo Games, a TV show
 Repo Man (disambiguation)
 Repo Man (film), a 1984 film by Alex Cox
 Repo Men, a 2010 film by Miguel Sapochnik
 Repo Chick
 Repository (disambiguation)